C.P. Company is an Italian apparel brand founded in 1971 by designer Massimo Osti. Initially called Chester Perry by the suggestion of his fashion entrepreneur friend Corrado Zannoni, its name was changed in 1978 following a lawsuit by Chester Barry and Fred Perry, for the use of their first name and surname.

C.P. Company clothing design often conducts research and design into military uniforms and work suits. 
It became known for its functional, military-inspired outerwear and the use of innovative fabrics, processing techniques and design. Its "Mille Miglia jacket" (also known as "Goggle jacket", 1988), features two clear lenses on the hood — the "goggle" — and one on the wrist, for the wristwatch. Since 1975 C.P. Company has produced over 40,000 garments.  Today, the brand has generated a large following within Dutch and English 'football hooligan' subculture. C.P. Company continues to deliver modern field jackets, soft shell goggle jackets, lens sleeve sweatshirts, and more.

Ownership
In 1984, Osti sold his company shares to GFT (Gruppo Finanziario Tessile), but stayed on as the brand's stylist until 1994. In 1993 the brand was acquired by Carlo Rivetti. Rivetti changed the name of the company from C.P. Company to Sportswear Company. In 2010 it was sold to Enzo Fusco's FGF Industry S.P.A.

In 2015, the company's intellectual property was bought by Hong Kong apparel group Tristate Holdings Limited.

See also
 Stone Island

References

Clothing companies of Italy